The Hôtel Porgès was a hôtel particulier on Avenue Montaigne in Paris, designed for Jules Porgès in 1892 by Ernest Sanson, with a garden by Achille Duchêne, on the site of the Maison pompéienne. It was sold in 1937 after his widow's death and demolished in the 1960s to make way for flats.

Sources

Porges 
Former buildings and structures in Paris
Buildings and structures demolished in the 1960s